Naberezhny is a rural locality (a settlement) in Krasnovishersky District, Perm Krai, Russia. The population was 354 as of 2010. There are 4 streets.

Geography 
Naberezhny is located 5 km north of Krasnovishersk (the district's administrative centre) by road. Bakhari is the nearest rural locality.

References 

Rural localities in Krasnovishersky District